Simon Zibo (born 30 November 1997) is a Ghanaian professional footballer who plays as a midfielder for Maltese team Birkirkara. He previously played for Portuguese teams Vitória Guimarães B and Esperança de Lagos and Ghana Premier League side Liberty Professionals.

Club career

Liberty Professionals 
Zibo started his career with Liberty Professionals in 2016. On 3 April 2016, during his debut, he played the full 90 minutes and scored his debut premier league goal in a 5–1 victory over Ashanti Gold. Latif Blessing scored a brace in that match. During the 2017 season, Zibo had become a key member of the team, starting and playing 21 league matches, whilst playing 13 league matches and scoring 2 goals during the truncated 2018 season. Zibo was appointed as the captain of the side ahead of the 2019 GFA Normalization Committee Special Competition. He played 13 out of the 14 matches played and scored 5 goals to help Liberty to a third-place finish in group B. At the end of the season, he was heavily linked to several clubs in Ghana Premier League including Hearts of Oak, Asante Kotoko and Aduana Stars.

Vitória Guimarães B. 
In 2019, he joined Portuguese side Vitória S.C. B, the reserve team of Vitória Guimarães. He signed a two-year deal with club with an option of a year renewal.

After an unsuccessful spell at Victoria B, Zibo signed for Campeonato de Portugal side Esperança de Lagos on a one-year deal in December 2020. He played 9 matches and scored one goal in his debut season.

Personal life
He is the older brother of fellow Ghanaian footballer Kwasi Sibo.

References

External links 

 
 

Living people
1997 births
Association football midfielders
Ghanaian footballers
Liberty Professionals F.C. players
Ghana Premier League players
Vitória S.C. B players
Campeonato de Portugal (league) players
Ghana youth international footballers
Ghanaian expatriate footballers
Ghanaian expatriate sportspeople in Portugal
Expatriate footballers in Portugal
Birkirkara F.C. players
Ghanaian expatriate sportspeople in Malta
Expatriate footballers in Malta
Maltese Premier League players